Achankovil Sastha Temple is a Hindu temple and one of the 108 Sasthalayas, located in Punalur Taluk tehsil of Kollam district in the Indian state of Kerala. It is also one among the famed Pancha Sastha temples in Kerala, the other four being Kulathupuzha, Aryankavu, Sabarimala and Kanthamala temples. An important river named after the locality, Achankovil river, originates near the temple.

Temple 
As in Sabarimala temple, Achankovil temple also have eighteen steps.

Ayyappa, the Mahavaidya
Lord Ayyappa / Aiyanar presides there in the form of grihastha (householder) and the idol faces east. It is believed to installed by Lord Parasurama himself.
The pratishta of Lord Ayyappa  here is quite unique from that of other Sastha shrines in Kerala. The idol is known as Rudraksha sila. He is depicted as a grihasthashrami (one who leads a married life) along with his two consorts Poorna and Pushkala. The temple is famed for curing poisonous Snakebites and thus Ayyappa is often portraited as a Mahavaidya (great physician). The right palm of the idol always keeps Chandanam (sandalwood paste) and Theertham (sacred waters) which is thought to have medicinal properties.

Access

There is a route through the forest from Alimukku near Pathanapuram to the temple. The panoramic Kumbuvurutty and Manalar falls are on the route to this shrine.

Distances to the temple from various places
 Thiruvananthapuram:(124 km) via Nedumangad - Kulathupuzha - Thenmala - Chenkottai
 Kollam:(85 km) via Kottarakkara - Punalur
 Pathanapuram:(45 km) via Konni - Achankovil road
 Kulathupuzha:(63 km) via Thenmala - Aryankavu, Shenkottai
 Konni:(41 km) via Kalleli - Kadiyar - Uliyanad - Mannarappara - Thura
 Punalur:(43 km) via Kumaramkudy-Mullumala route.
 Tenkasi:(25 km) via Achankovil - Panpoli - Tenkasi 

Railway:
The nearest railway stations are at Tenkasi Junction railway station, Sengottai , Thenmala, Kottarakkara and Punalur.

Airports:
Thiruvananthapuram international airport is about 140 km and Cochin international airport about 180 km.

Festivals
The Thiruvutsavam (annual festival) and Mandala pooja is hosted in the Malayalam month of Dhanu (December to January) for 10 days and celebrated in grand style. The Thiruvabharanam (sacred ornaments) procession to the temple via Punalur, Aryankavu, Shenkottai and Tenkasi is another attraction. Pushpabhisheka is conducted on 8th of Makaram. Revathi festival is hosted during the months of January and February. The main offering of the deity is  Karuppanootu to appease Karuppaswami, a great friend of Ayyappa. The Therottam (chariot festival), Karuppanthullal and Chapparam procession held on the 9th day of festival is very much similar to the rituals in Tamil Nadu.

Subordinate deities
The temple holds a number of sub-deities like Malikappurathamma, Durga, Nagaraja, Nagayakshi, Ganapathi, Muruga, Karuppaswami, Karuppayi amma, Cheppanimundan, Chappanimaadan, Madanthevan, Kalamadan, Kochattinarayanan, Shingali bhootathan and Arukola. The back portion of the temple has a Kavu where the Naga (serpent) deity is worshipped for the welfare and sake.

See also
 Kulathupuzha Sastha Temple
 Erumely Sree Dharmasastha Temple

References

Hindu temples in Kollam district

ml:അച്ചൻകോവിൽ ശാസ്താക്ഷേത്രം